Jaren or Jarren is a given name.

People

Jarren Benton (born 1981), American rapper and songwriter
Jaren Cerf (born 1983), American singer and songwriter
Jarren Duran (born 1996), American baseball player
Jaren Hall (born 1998), American football player
Jaren Jackson (born 1967), American basketball coach and former player
Jaren Jackson Jr. (born 1999), American basketball player
Jaren Johnston (born 1980), American singer and songwriter
Jaren Lewison (born 2000), American actor
Jaren Sina (born 1994), Kosovan-American basketball player
Jarren Williams (disambiguation), multiple people

See also
Jaron, given name and surname
Jarron, given name